The Bystrytsia is a river, a right tributary of the Dniester which flows through Ivano-Frankivsk Raion, Ivano-Frankivsk Oblast.

Bystrytsia river is formed by confluence of Bystrytsia of Solotvyn and Bystrytsia of Nadvirna.

Formation and course

Both of the branches, typical mountain rivers, of the Bystrytsia river take their sourch in the Gorgany Mountains of the Carpathian mountain range in the Ukrainian province of Ivano-Frankivsk.

The name, Bystrytsia, comes from the Slavic word "бистрий" - bystry, which is translated as fast or fast moving.

References

External links

 Bystrytsia at Encyclopedia of Ukraine.

Rivers of Ivano-Frankivsk Oblast